Bayramly (also, Bairamh and Bairamli) is a village in the Gadabay Rayon of Azerbaijan.

References 

Populated places in Gadabay District